The Devil's Teardrop is a novel published in 1999, written by author Jeffery Deaver. It, like other books of Deaver's, is a suspense-crime novel and contains several plot twists. Deaver, whose suspense fiction has been hailed as "a thrill ride between covers" by the Los Angeles Times, imagines a chilling scenario: a killer who is set to strike on the last night of this millennium – and unleash a devastation plot of murder and mayhem. The devil's teardrop is also a nickname for obsidian.

It was the basis for the 2010 made-for-TV movie of the same name, starring Tom Everett Scott and Natasha Henstridge.

Synopsis
From the Back cover: New Year's Eve, 1999. An early-morning machine-gun attack by the Digger, an emotionless, robotic killer, leaves dozens dead in the Washington D.C. subway system. In a message to the mayor's office, a criminal mastermind demands twenty million dollars by midnight or the capital will again be at the mercy of his accomplice. But en route to the money drop, the devious extortionist is killed in a freak accident. The Digger, without orders to desist, prepares for his midnight massacre. With the ransom note as the only evidence, Special Agent Margaret Lukas calls upon Parker Kincaid, a retired FBI agent and top forensic document examiner, to join the manhunt. By midnight, they must track down the Digger – or for hundreds, the first moments of the new millennium will be their last moments alive.

Plot summary
On New Year's Eve morning, 1999, in Dupont Circle, Washington, D.C., a killer referred to as 'the Digger' guns down tens of innocent people at the metro station. A man, Gilbert Havel, sends a letter to the Mayor Gerald Kennedy demanding twenty million dollars cash to be dropped off at a park near Interstate 66 in bags. The letter goes on to explain that if his demands are not met the Digger will continue to strike at secret locations – at 4 p.m., 8 p.m. and at Midnight. Kennedy decides to deliver the money to the extortionist to ensure no more innocents are harmed and to make sure the town doesn't lose faith in the Mayor as election time is nearing.

Agent Margret Lukas, the agent responsible for the case, wants to either put tracking on the bags, or take the extortionist down when he comes for the money. However, Havel is killed in a hit-and-run incident before he can make it to the drop-off point.

All that Agent Margret has now is a letter, a dead body, and the knowledge that since the Digger had not been called off he will continue to carry on the remaining attacks. Assisting her in the investigation are officer Len Hardy and Detective Cage.

At his home, retired FBI Document Examiner Parker Kincaid is spending time with his daughter and son and studying a letter that was supposedly written by late President Thomas Jefferson. It is when he is debating the authenticity of the letter that his ex-wife, Joan, comes and tells him that she wants the custody of their children. To Parker's dismay Joan's social worker will be at his house the next day.

Parker receives an unwanted call from Cage, an old friend, and Cage tells Parker that he needs Parker's help with a letter based on the subway shootings. Sensing this as a bad idea because of his children, Parker declines. After some time pondering about the shooting and all the innocent children like his own that had died and ensuring his son Robby that 'the Boatman' (a suspect from Parker's past case that tried to break in Robby's window) won't show up, Parker shows up under Lukas' investigation site.

Parker studies the letter and concludes that although the writer seems dumb or foreign by the mistakes he makes, that it is on purpose and the extortionist is actually intellectual. He also makes note of a strange stroke done over the letter 'i' which he dubs the 'Devil's Teardrop'.

In scans conducted by Hardy and Parker there is an imprint on letter caused by being under another piece of paper. The imprint has '-tel' which the team concludes that the second attack site must be a hotel.

References

1999 American novels
Novels by Jeffery Deaver
Novels set in Washington, D.C.
Simon & Schuster books
American novels adapted into films
American novels adapted into television shows